Tapuaetai (tapuae: footprint; ta'i: one), or "One Foot Island", is one of 22 islands in the Aitutaki atoll of the Cook Islands. It is located on the southeastern perimeter of Aitutaki Lagoon immediately to the southwest of the larger island of Tekopua, seven kilometres to the east of the main island of Aitutaki. The island is 570m long and up to 210m wide, with an average elevation of 1.5m above sea level.

One Foot Island was awarded "Australasia's Leading Beach" at the World Travel Awards held in Sydney in June 2008.

References 

Islands of Aitutaki